Mark Splitter is an American football coach. He served as the head football coach at Sterling College in Sterling, Kansas for three seasons, from 2001 to 2003, compiling a record 4–26.

Head coaching record

References

Year of birth missing (living people)
Living people
Sterling Warriors football coaches